Store Hellstugutinden is a mountain in Lom Municipality in Innlandet county, Norway. The mountain is surrounded by several other notable mountains including Blåbreahøe and Surtningssue to the east; Reinstinden and Hinnotefjellet to the southeast; Nestsøre Hellstugutinden and Søre Hellstugutinden to the south; Semeltinden to the southwest; Urdadalstindene to the west; Midtre Hellstugutinden and Nørdre Hellstugutinden to the north; and Store Memurutinden and Austre Memurutinden to the northeast.

Store Hellstugutinden is the highest of several peaks along the Hellstugutindane ridge which runs between the Hellstugubrean/Vestre Memurubrean glaciers in east and Urdadalen valley in the west. The ridge Hellstugutindane consists of these mountain peaks:
 Nordre Hellstugutinden
 Midtre Hellstugutinden
 Store Hellstugutinden
 Nestsøndre Hellstugutinden
 Søndre Hellstugutinden

Name
The first element is the name of the Hellstugu cabin which was built as a shelter for hunters. The last element is the finite form of tind which means 'mountain peak'. The name of the cabin is a compound of hella which means 'flat stone' or 'flagstone' and stugu which means 'house with one room' or 'cabin'. Most houses in Norway are mostly made of wood, but here they had to use stone because the lack of wood. The first word in the name is store which means 'big'.

See also
List of mountains of Norway by height

References

Jotunheimen
Lom, Norway
Mountains of Innlandet